Millersville is an unincorporated community in Anne Arundel County, Maryland, United States. Population was 20,965 in 2015 based on American Community Survey (U.S. Census Bureau) data.

Geography
Millersville is located at  (39.0596, -76.6480).

History
Millersville, named for the first Postmaster, George Miller, was the first Post Office to be established, on July 24, 1841, along the Annapolis & Elkridge Railroad (the A & E). Completed in 1840, the A & E was one of the earliest rail lines in the U.S., connecting Annapolis with the Washington Branch of the Baltimore and Ohio Railroad. Today, Millersville is largely suburban, but the core of the historic village remains. The Childs Residence, listed on the National Register of Historic Places in 1986, is a focal point of the new bike trail that passes through the historic core.

Education

Secondary schools
Elvaton Christian Academy
Old Mill High School
Rockbridge Academy
Olde Mill Christian Academy
Old Mill Middle North
Old Mill Middle South
Severna Park Middle School (serves Millersville students residing in Shipley’s Choice and Brittingham)
Severna Park High School (serves Millersville students residing in Shipley’s Choice and Brittingham)

Colleges and universities
Anne Arundel Community College

288-acre park

Parks and recreation
 Baltimore & Annapolis Trail
 Kinder Farm Park
 Southgate/Old Mill Park

References

Unincorporated communities in Anne Arundel County, Maryland
Unincorporated communities in Maryland